= Salvador Dijols =

Puerto Rican basketball player

Salvador Dijols (11 November 1940 in Ponce, Puerto Rico– 2 August 2010 in Río Piedras, Puerto Rico) was a Puerto Rican basketball player.
